Alexis Georgoulis (born 1974) is a Greek actor and politician.

Personal life
Georgoulis was born on 6 October 1974 in Larissa, Greece.  His father worked for a lottery and his mother taught kindergarten.  Georgoulis served in the Hellenic Army, and began studying civil engineering at the National Technical University of Athens in 1993.  In 1996, he began acting with local drama schools, and in 1997, he was accepted to the Vasilis Diamantopoulos' Jasmine drama school.

Acting
After performing with the dance troupe Heresis in their renditions of Carmen 33 and The Return, Georgoulis began working in television.  He first took smaller roles in Alice in Wonderland and Death Agony, but it was his co-starring role in 2001's Eisai to Tairi mou that elevated the Greek actor to stardom.  According to the WGBH Educational Foundation, in recognition of his fame, Georgoulis is called the "George Clooney of Greece" therein.

Performance credits

Dance

Television

Film

Politics
As a member of Syriza, he was elected to the European Parliament on 26 May 2019 for a four-year term.  His platform included the promotion of the cinema of Greece.

References

External links
 

1974 births
actors from Larissa
Aristotle University of Thessaloniki alumni
Greek male actors
living people
MEPs for Greece 2019–2024
politicians from Larissa
Syriza MEPs